Cancura is a village in the southeastern part of the commune of Osorno in south-central Chile. It lies along the left (northern) bank of Rahue River about halfway between its origin in Rupanco Lake and its passage through the city of Osorno. The town had 786 inhabitants as of 2017.

References

Populated places in Osorno Province